180 is the first studio album by London indie rock group Palma Violets. It was released on 25 February 2013 and follows their debut single "Best of Friends" the previous year, which was selected as 'Best Track Of 2012' by NME magazine.

Background 

The album title is taken from the studio in Lambeth, London in which the band often performs. Palma Violets signed to Rough Trade Records in May 2012, a label that features The Libertines, The Strokes and The Smiths as signed artists.

Track listing

References 

2013 debut albums
Rough Trade Records albums
Palma Violets albums